In thermal fluid dynamics, the Nusselt number (after Wilhelm Nusselt) is the ratio of convective to conductive heat transfer at a boundary in a fluid. Convection includes both advection (fluid motion) and diffusion (conduction). The conductive component is measured under the same conditions as the convective but for a hypothetically motionless fluid. It is a dimensionless number, closely related to the fluid's Rayleigh number.

A Nusselt number of value one (zero) represents heat transfer by pure conduction. A value between one (zero) and 10 is characteristic of slug flow or laminar flow. A larger Nusselt number corresponds to more active convection, with turbulent flow typically in the 100–1000 range. 

A similar non-dimensional property is the Biot number, which concerns thermal conductivity for a solid body rather than a fluid. The mass transfer analogue of the Nusselt number is the Sherwood number.

Definition
The Nusselt number is the ratio of convective to conductive heat transfer across a boundary. The convection and conduction heat flows are parallel to each other and to the surface normal of the boundary surface, and are all perpendicular to the mean fluid flow in the simple case.

where h is the convective heat transfer coefficient of the flow, L is the characteristic length, and k is the thermal conductivity of the fluid.

 Selection of the characteristic length should be in the direction of growth (or thickness) of the boundary layer; some examples of characteristic length are: the outer diameter of a cylinder in (external) cross flow (perpendicular to the cylinder axis), the length  of a vertical plate undergoing natural convection, or the diameter of a sphere. For complex shapes, the length may be defined as the volume of the fluid body divided by the surface area.
 The thermal conductivity of the fluid is typically (but not always) evaluated at the film temperature, which for engineering purposes may be calculated as the mean-average of the bulk fluid temperature and wall surface temperature.

In contrast to the definition given above, known as average Nusselt number, the local Nusselt number is defined by taking the length to be the distance from the surface boundary to the local point of interest.

The mean, or average, number is obtained by integrating the expression over the range of interest, such as:

Context
An understanding of convection boundary layers is necessary to understanding convective heat transfer between a surface and a fluid flowing past it. A thermal boundary layer develops if the fluid free stream temperature and the surface temperatures differ. A temperature profile exists due to the energy exchange resulting from this temperature difference.

The heat transfer rate can be written using Newton's law of cooling as

,

where h is the heat transfer coefficient and A is the heat transfer surface area. Because heat transfer at the surface is by conduction, the same quantity can be expressed in terms of the thermal conductivity k:

.

These two terms are equal; thus

.

Rearranging,

.

Multiplying by a representative length L gives a dimensionless expression:

.

The right-hand side is now the ratio of the temperature gradient at the surface to the reference temperature gradient, while the left-hand side is similar to the Biot modulus. This becomes the ratio of conductive thermal resistance to the convective thermal resistance of the fluid, otherwise known as the Nusselt number, Nu.

.

Derivation
The Nusselt number may be obtained by a non-dimensional analysis of Fourier's law since it is equal to the dimensionless temperature gradient at the surface:

, where q is the heat transfer rate, k is the constant thermal conductivity and T the fluid temperature.
Indeed, if:  and 

we arrive at

then we define

so the equation becomes

By integrating over the surface of the body:

,

where .

Empirical correlations
Typically, for free convection, the average Nusselt number is expressed as a function of the Rayleigh number and the Prandtl number, written as:

Otherwise, for forced convection, the Nusselt number is generally a function of the Reynolds number and the Prandtl number, or

Empirical correlations for a wide variety of geometries are available that express the Nusselt number in the aforementioned forms.

Free convection

Free convection at a vertical wall
Cited as coming from Churchill and Chu:

Free convection from horizontal plates
If the characteristic length is defined

Then for the top surface of a hot object in a colder environment or bottom surface of a cold object in a hotter environment

And for the bottom surface of a hot object in a colder environment or top surface of a cold object in a hotter environment

Forced convection on flat plate

Flat plate in laminar flow

The average Nusselt number for laminar flow over a flat plate, from the edge of the plate to a downstream distance , is given by

Sphere in convective flow

In some applications, such as the evaporation of spherical liquid droplets in air, the following correlation is used:

Forced convection in turbulent pipe flow

Gnielinski correlation
Gnielinski's correlation for turbulent flow in tubes:

where f is the Darcy friction factor that can either be obtained from the Moody chart or for smooth tubes from correlation developed by Petukhov:

The Gnielinski Correlation is valid for:

Dittus–Boelter equation
The Dittus–Boelter equation (for turbulent flow) as introduced by W.H. McAdams is an explicit function for calculating the Nusselt number. It is easy to solve but is less accurate when there is a large temperature difference across the fluid. It is tailored to smooth tubes, so use for rough tubes (most commercial applications) is cautioned. The Dittus–Boelter equation is:

where:
 is the inside diameter of the circular duct
 is the Prandtl number

The Dittus–Boelter equation is valid for

The Dittus–Boelter equation is a good approximation where temperature differences between bulk fluid and heat transfer surface are minimal, avoiding equation complexity and iterative solving.

Sieder–Tate correlation
The Sieder–Tate correlation for turbulent flow is an implicit function, as it analyzes the system as a nonlinear boundary value problem. The Sieder–Tate result can be more accurate as it takes into account the change in viscosity ( and ) due to temperature change between the bulk fluid average temperature and the heat transfer surface temperature, respectively. The Sieder–Tate correlation is normally solved by an iterative process, as the viscosity factor will change as the Nusselt number changes.

where:
 is the fluid viscosity at the bulk fluid temperature
 is the fluid viscosity at the heat-transfer boundary surface temperature

The Sieder–Tate correlation is valid for

Forced convection in fully developed laminar pipe flow
For fully developed internal laminar flow, the Nusselt numbers tend towards a constant value for long pipes.

For internal flow:

where:

Dh = Hydraulic diameter
kf = thermal conductivity of the fluid
h = convective heat transfer coefficient

Convection with uniform temperature for circular tubes
From Incropera & DeWitt,

Convection with uniform heat flux for circular tubes
For the case of constant surface heat flux,

See also
 Sherwood number (mass transfer Nusselt number)
 Churchill–Bernstein equation
 Biot number
 Reynolds number
 Convective heat transfer
 Heat transfer coefficient
 Thermal conductivity

References

External links
 Simple derivation of the Nusselt number from Newton's law of cooling (Accessed 23 September 2009)

Convection
Dimensionless numbers of fluid mechanics
Dimensionless numbers of thermodynamics
Fluid dynamics
Heat transfer